Sir John Helier Le Rougetel  (19 June 1894 – 3 January 1975) was a British diplomat.

Le Rougetel was educated at Rossall School and Magdalene College, Cambridge. He was commissioned into the Northamptonshire Regiment at the start of the First World War, joining its 3rd Battalion. He was awarded the Military Cross and Bar for his actions during the war, in which he served on the Western Front and was attached to the Machine Gun Corps. Le Rougtel joined the Foreign Office in 1920, and subsequently served in postings in Vienna, Budapest, Ottawa, Tokyo, Pekin, The Hague, Bucharest, Moscow, Shanghai. He was made a Second Secretary in 1923 and a First Secretary in 1930. He was in Shanghai during its occupation by the Japanese and was taken prisoner in 1942, although was later repatriated. He was made a Companion of the Order of St Michael and St George in 1943. From 1944 to 1946 he was Political Representative in Romania, before receiving his first ambassadorial posting to Tehran in 1946. Le Rougetel later served as British Ambassador to Belgium (1950-1) and as a High Commissioner to South Africa (1951-5). He retired in 1955, having been made a Knight Commander of the Order of St Michael and St George.

References

1894 births
1975 deaths
British diplomats
People educated at Rossall School
Alumni of Magdalene College, Cambridge
Northamptonshire Regiment officers
Recipients of the Military Cross
Knights Commander of the Order of St Michael and St George